The Mohnenfluh is a 2,544-metre-high mountain in the Austrian state of Vorarlberg.

The Mohnenfluh is the second-highest summit in the region of Schröcken after the Braunarlspitze, and is in the Lechquellen Mountains. An ascent is usually made via the Mohnen Saddle (2,315 m) and the south arête.
The Bregenzer Ach rises on the eastern flank of the Mohnenfluh above Schröcken at a height of about 2,400 metres.

The name "Mohn(-en)" may be connected to the word Mond ("moon"). 

Because there are also mountain meadows or Bergmähder nearby, it may be derived from "Mahd" / "Mähen" ("meadow").

References

External links

Mountains of Vorarlberg
Mountains of the Alps
Lechquellen Mountains